Sinochelyidae is an extinct family of Testudinoidea turtles found in China.

Genera
Heishanemys
Sinochelys

References

Testudinoidea
Extinct turtles